Clusia clarendonensis is a species of flowering plant in the family Clusiaceae. It is found only in Jamaica.

References

clarendonensis
Vulnerable plants
Endemic flora of Jamaica
Taxonomy articles created by Polbot